Kasyo Dam is a gravity dam located in Tottori prefecture in Japan. The dam is used for flood control and water supply. The catchment area of the dam is 26 km2. The dam impounds about 64  ha of land when full and can store 7450 thousand cubic meters of water. The construction of the dam was started on 1971 and completed in 1988.

References

Dams in Tottori Prefecture
1988 establishments in Japan